Thomas Zechel (born January 25, 1965) is a retired German football player.

Honours
 UEFA Cup winner: 1988.

External links
 

1965 births
Living people
German footballers
Bayer 04 Leverkusen players
Hannover 96 players
SV Waldhof Mannheim players
FC Schalke 04 players
1. FC Saarbrücken players
UEFA Cup winning players
Bundesliga players
Germany under-21 international footballers
Association football midfielders